Crematogaster borneensis is a species of ant in tribe Crematogastrini. It was described by Andre in 1896.

References

borneensis
Insects described in 1896